Crystal Beach is a hamlet (and census-designated place) in Ontario County, New York, United States. Its population was 644 as of the 2010 census. The community is located on the eastern shore of Canandaigua Lake and is served by New York State Route 364.

Geography

History 
Before being established as Crystal Beach, the land was originally owned by the Washburn family, who maintained a large grape farm. In 1929, Paul Ritchie, owner of Finger Lakes Company, purchased the farm and the subsequent land. He began planning a large housing development in the area. The company built a grid of roads, and dedicated land for neighborhood parks. 965 30 ft x 80 ft lots were built for housing. Midway through building the new cottages at Crystal Beach, the Great Depression hit, and all development seized. Many of the homes built after the Great Depression were built by non-professional individuals, which is why we see a large variation of style and quality of homes in the Crystal Beach area today.

In 2016, the mean price of all housing units was $267,468.

Public Parks
 Deep Run Park
Deep Run Park is Carry In/Carry Out park that is open from Memorial Day to Labor Day. On-duty lifeguards are posted from 10am - 9pm, and features 8 picnic tables, several grills and public restrooms.
 Ontario Beach Park 
 Crystal Beach Park

References

Hamlets in Ontario County, New York
Hamlets in New York (state)
Census-designated places in Ontario County, New York
Census-designated places in New York (state)